Deborah Warner  (born 12 May 1959) is a British director of theatre and opera, known for her interpretations of the works of Shakespeare, Bertolt Brecht, Benjamin Britten and Henrik Ibsen.

Early life
Warner was born in Oxfordshire, England, to antiquarians Roger Harold Metford Warner and Ruth Ernestine Hurcombe. After attending Sidcot School and St Clare's, Oxford, she studied Stage Management at Central School of Speech and Drama. In 1980 she founded the KICK theatre company when she was 21.

Career

Warner has since the 1980s worked in close creative partnership with the actor Fiona Shaw, developing a wide range of projects that have been seen throughout Europe and the United States. The Sunday Times critic John Peter wrote of their vision of Richard II that "Warner and Shaw are not being either fashionable or reactionary ... They are making theatre that is an adventure, a journey of the mind, a discovery of other ages, other countries, other people, other minds." Warner has also enjoyed long-term collaborations with the designers , Hildegard Bechtler, Tom Pye,  and the choreographer Kim Brandstrup.

Although the majority of her work has focused on major classics of spoken drama and opera, she has also experimented with the performance of poetry (The Waste Land, Readings) and the staging of oratorios (St John Passion, Messiah), as well as installations (The St Pancras and Angel projects, Peace Camp). She has made relatively few excursions into new work (Jeanette Winterson's The Powerbook (2002), Tansy Davies' 2015 opera Between Worlds and The Testament of Mary being exceptions) or comedy (The School for Scandal), and although she has made much creative use of video on stage, she has directed little for film and television.

Her first creations for Kick, a company that she started and managed, were deeply influenced by the example of Peter Brook and his belief that the performer must always be at the centre of the event. "I'm not sure I would have been in any way conscious of the potency of theatre if I hadn't seen his work", she said in an interview with Vogue in July 1994. Other figures important in her formative years include Peter Stein, who commissioned her production of Coriolanus at the Salzburg Festival, and Nicholas Payne and Anthony Whitworth-Jones who commissioned her first essays in opera, at Opera North and Glyndebourne respectively.

Although she has refused to subscribe to a programmatic feminism or a political ideology, her work has often explored issues of gender, notably in her ground-breaking casting of Fiona Shaw as Shakespeare's Richard II. She was also the first woman director to be given sole charge of a production in the main house of the Royal Shakespeare Theatre.

Theatre
In 1987 Warner joined the Royal Shakespeare Company, where she directed Titus Andronicus and where she also began her long-time collaboration with Fiona Shaw. Warner and Shaw have collaborated on plays including Electra (RSC); The Good Person of Sezuan (1989, National Theatre); Hedda Gabler (1991, The Abbey Theatre and BBC2); the controversial Richard II, with Shaw in the title role, also at the National Theatre (1995) and televised by BBC2; Footfalls, whose radical staging so enraged the Beckett estate that the production was pulled during its run; The PowerBook, at the National Theatre, a dramatisation of Jeanette Winterson's novel; Medea (2000–2001, Queen's Theatre and Broadway); and Shakespeare's Julius Caesar, in which Shaw played the small part of Portia. The production starred Ralph Fiennes and Simon Russell Beale; first staged at the Barbican Centre, it later toured Europe. Shaw and Warner toured the world with T. S. Eliot's The Waste Land, which began in Wilton's Music Hall in London's East End. Her work began to focus on the link of drama to places, a theme which was expanded upon in her Angel Project. In 2007, following negotiations with the Beckett estate, Warner directed Shaw in Happy Days at the National Theatre, which toured internationally including at the ancient amphitheatre at Epidaurus in Greece and Brooklyn Academy of Music in New York, followed in 2009 by Mother Courage and Her Children (with Shaw in the title role) at the Olivier Theatre at the National. She returned to the Barbican Centre in 2011 to direct The School for Scandal.

Opera and classical music
Warner has also worked extensively in field of opera and classical music, including a production of The Diary of One Who Disappeared by Janáček starring Ian Bostridge; a staging of the St John Passion at English National Opera; a controversial staging of Mozart's Don Giovanni at Glyndebourne; Wozzeck for Opera North; Death in Venice and Tansy Davies' Between Worlds at English National Opera; and Henry Purcell's Dido and Aeneas with Les Arts Florissants in Vienna, Paris and Amsterdam. Other notable productions include opening the 2015/15 season at La Scala, Milan, with Fidelio conducted by Daniel Barenboim and Tchaikovsky's Eugene Onegin at the Metropolitan Opera in New York in the 2013/2014 season.

She frequently collaborates with Canadian set designer Michael Levine.

Film
Warner directed the 1999 film The Last September, starring Michael Gambon and Maggie Smith.

Awards and nominations
Awards
 1988 Laurence Olivier Award for Best Director – Titus Andronicus
 1992 Laurence Olivier Award for Best Director of a Play – Hedda Gabler
 1992 Chevalier of the Ordre des Arts et des Lettres
 2006 Commander of the Order of the British Empire (CBE), "for services to drama".
Nominations
 1997 Drama Desk Award for Outstanding Director of a Play – The Waste Land
 2003 Drama Desk Award for Outstanding Director of a Play – Medea
 2003 Tony Award for Best Direction of a Play – Medea
 2008 Drama Desk Award for Outstanding Director of a Play – Happy Days

Chronology

References

External links
 
 

 

1959 births
Living people
Alumni of the Royal Central School of Speech and Drama
Commanders of the Order of the British Empire
English theatre directors
Laurence Olivier Award winners
British opera directors
People from Oxfordshire
Chevaliers of the Ordre des Arts et des Lettres
People educated at Sidcot School
People educated at St. Clare's, Oxford
Women theatre directors
Female opera directors